The Antarctica Marathon® may have been the first for-profit sporting event held in Antarctica, on January 28, 1995. The event is now held every year in late February or early March. The  race is held on King George Island, one of the largest Antarctic Islands just off the Antarctic Peninsula. There is also a half-marathon held at the same time. The start and finish is at Bellingshausen Station (the Russian base), and the course passes the Artigas Base (Uruguayan), the Frei Base (Chilean) and the Great Wall Base (Chinese). The course follows a gravel road that connects the bases and changes each year based on the base operations as well as road and weather conditions.

History
Thom Gilligan, Founder and CEO of Marathon Tours & Travel, organized the first race in 1995. In 2001, safety concerns prevented the zodiac boats from transporting race participants from the ship to the shore. The marathon was held by running 442 laps around Deck 6 of the ship. The 22nd running of the Antarctica Marathon & Half-Marathon®  took place in January and February of 2022.

Other Marathons in Antarctica

McMurdo Marathon
The first marathon held in Antarctica may have been near the American research base, McMurdo Station, in January 1995. The annual marathon is free and is open to employees and grantees of the United States Antarctic Program, United States Air Force personnel on duty at McMurdo Station, as well as Kiwis from New Zealand's nearby research station, Scott Base. Many participants run the full marathon. However, a half marathon option is available. Some participants elect to ski the course.

South Pole
The South Pole has also witnessed runners braving conditions to complete a full  race. Both for-profit and free events have been held outside the Amundsen–Scott South Pole Station. The South Pole is possibly the first known location of an ultramarathon on the continent, when defining an Ultra as any race greater in length than a marathon.

Past results

See also
The Last Desert
Antarctic Ice Marathon

References

External links

Recurring sporting events established in 1995
Marathons
Half marathons
South Shetland Islands
Sports in Antarctica
1995 establishments in Antarctica
2015 in Antarctica
History of the Ross Dependency